Tirumalarajanar River is a tributary of the Kodamurutti River which, itself, is a tributary of the river Kaveri. It branches off from the Kodamurutti near Papanasam and flows through the districts of Thanjavur, Tiruvarur and Nagapattinam in Tamil Nadu and the Niravi and Tirumalarajanpattinam communes of the Karaikal District of Puducherry before joining the Bay of Bengal near Tirumalarajanpattinam.

References 
 

Rivers of Tamil Nadu
Rivers of India